Peperomia zongolicana is a species of plant from the genus Peperomia. It was described by Héctor David Jimeno-Sevilla and Daniela Vergara-Rodríguez in 2018,  from type material collected in Veracruz, Mexico in 2015 at an elevation of 651 meters.

References

zongolicana
Flora of North America
Flora of Mexico
Plants described in 2018
Flora of the Sierra Madre de Oaxaca